Al Mahfad District  is a district of the Abyan Governorate, Yemen. As of 2003, the district had a population of 26,870 inhabitants.

References

Districts of Abyan Governorate